Heptane or n-heptane is the straight-chain alkane with the chemical formula H3C(CH2)5CH3 or C7H16. When used as a test fuel component in anti-knock test engines, a 100% heptane fuel is the zero point of the octane rating scale (the 100 point is 100% iso-octane). Octane number equates to the anti-knock qualities of a comparison mixture of heptane and isooctane which is expressed as the percentage of isooctane in heptane and is listed on pumps for gasoline (petrol) dispensed globally.

Uses
Heptane (and its many isomers) is widely used in laboratories as a non-polar solvent. As a liquid, it is ideal for transport and storage. In the grease spot test, heptane is used to dissolve an oil spot to show the previous presence of organic compounds on a stained paper. This is done by shaking the stained paper in a heptane solution for about half a minute.

Aqueous bromine may be distinguished from aqueous iodine by its appearance after extraction into heptane. In water, both bromine and iodine appear brown.  However, iodine turns purple when dissolved in heptane, whereas the bromine solution remains brown.

Heptane is commercially available as mixed isomers for use in paints and coatings, as the rubber cement solvent "Bestine", the outdoor stove fuel "Powerfuel" by Primus, as pure n-heptane for research and development and pharmaceutical manufacturing and as a minor component of gasoline (petrol). On average, gasoline is about 1% heptane.

Heptane is also used as an adhesive remover by stamp collectors. Since 1974, the United States Postal Service has issued self-adhesive stamps that some collectors find difficult to separate from envelopes via the traditional method of soaking in water. Heptane-based products like Bestine, as well as limonene-based products, have become popular solvents for removing stamps more easily.

Octane rating scale
n-Heptane is defined as the zero point of the octane rating scale. It is a lighter component in gasoline, burns more explosively, causing engine pre-ignition (knocking) in its pure form, as opposed to octane isomers, which burn more slowly and give less knocking. It was originally chosen as the zero point of the scale because of the availability of very high purity n-heptane, unmixed with other isomers of heptane or other alkanes, distilled from the resin of Jeffrey pine and from the fruit of Pittosporum resiniferum. Other sources of heptane and octane, produced from crude oil, contain a mixture of different isomers with greatly differing ratings, and do not give as precise a zero point.

Isomers and enantiomers

Heptane has nine isomers, or eleven if enantiomers are counted:
 Heptane (n-heptane), H3C–CH2–CH2–CH2–CH2–CH2–CH3,
 2-Methylhexane (isoheptane), H3C–CH(CH3)–CH2–CH2–CH2–CH3,
 3-Methylhexane, H3C–CH2–C*H(CH3)–CH2–CH2–CH3 (chiral),
 2,2-Dimethylpentane  (neoheptane), H3C–C(CH3)2–CH2–CH2–CH3,
 2,3-Dimethylpentane, H3C–CH(CH3)–C*H(CH3)–CH2–CH3 (chiral),
 2,4-Dimethylpentane, H3C–CH(CH3)–CH2–CH(CH3)–CH3,
 3,3-Dimethylpentane, H3C–CH2–C(CH3)2–CH2–CH3,
 3-Ethylpentane, H3C–CH2–CH(CH2CH3)–CH2–CH3,
 2,2,3-Trimethylbutane, H3C–C(CH3)2–CH(CH3)–CH3, this isomer is also known as pentamethylethane and triptane.

Preparation
The linear n-heptane can be obtained from Jeffrey pine oil.  The six branched isomers without a quaternary carbon can be prepared by creating a suitable secondary or tertiary alcohol by the Grignard reaction, converting it to an alkene by dehydration, and hydrogenating the latter.  The 2,2-dimethylpentane isomer can be prepared by reacting tert-butyl chloride with n-propyl magnesium bromide.   The 3,3-dimethylpentane isomer can be prepared from tert-amyl chloride and ethyl magnesium bromide.

Health risks

Heptane can affect a person when breathed in.

Acute exposure to heptane vapors can cause dizziness, stupor, incoordination, loss of appetite, nausea, dermatitis, chemical pneumonitis, unconsciousness, or possible peripheral neuropathy.

In a CDC study, it was found that prolonged exposure to heptane may also cause a state of intoxication and uncontrolled hilarity in some participants and a stupor lasting for 30 minutes after exposure for others.

According to information from the New Jersey Department of Health and Senior Services, n-heptane can penetrate through the skin and further health effects may occur immediately or shortly after exposure to it. Exposure to n-Heptane may lead to: short-term health effects like irritation of the eyes, nose, or throat, headache, dizziness, or loss of consciousness; and chronic health effects, like reduced memory and concentration, sleep disturbance, or reduced coordination due to its effects on the nervous system.

References

External links
 International Chemical Safety Card 0657 (n-heptane)
 International Chemical Safety Card 0658 (2-methylhexane)
 NIOSH Pocket Guide to Chemical Hazards
 Material Safety Data Sheet for Heptane
 Phytochemical database entry

Alkanes
Hydrocarbon solvents